Ray Mitchell (28 March 1921 – 25 March 2001) was an Australian wrestler. He competed at the 1956 Summer Olympics and the 1960 Summer Olympics.

References

External links
 

1921 births
2001 deaths
Australian male sport wrestlers
Olympic wrestlers of Australia
Wrestlers at the 1956 Summer Olympics
Wrestlers at the 1960 Summer Olympics
Commonwealth Games medallists in wrestling
Commonwealth Games silver medallists for Australia
Commonwealth Games bronze medallists for Australia
Wrestlers at the 1958 British Empire and Commonwealth Games
Wrestlers at the 1962 British Empire and Commonwealth Games
Medallists at the 1958 British Empire and Commonwealth Games
Medallists at the 1962 British Empire and Commonwealth Games